Alright Guy is the fourth studio album by American country music singer Gary Allan. It was released in October 2001 via MCA Records Nashville. It produced three singles. The album's first single, "Man of Me", reached number 18 on the US Billboard Hot Country Songs charts. The second single, "The One", became Allan's second Top 5 hit with a peak at number 3. The third  and final single, "Man to Man", became Allan's first number one hit. Like his previous album, Smoke Rings in the Dark (1999), Alright Guy was also certified platinum by the RIAA.

The title track was written by Todd Snider and originally appeared on his 1994 album Songs for the Daily Planet. "What I'd Say" was a number 1 hit for Earl Thomas Conley in 1989 from his 1988 album The Heart of It All. "What's on My Mind" was later recorded by Blake Shelton on his 2004 album Blake Shelton's Barn & Grill. "What Would Willie Do" had been released a month prior by the songwriter, Bruce Robison, on his 2001 Country Sunshine album.

Track listing

Personnel
Gary Allan - lead vocals
Chad Cromwell - drums
Jake Kelly - acoustic guitar
Joe Manuel - acoustic guitar
Steve Nathan - keyboards
Michael Rhodes - bass guitar
Brent Rowan - electric guitar
John Wesley Ryles - background vocals
Hank Singer - fiddle, mandolin
Harry Stinson - background vocals
Robby Turner - steel guitar
John Willis - acoustic guitar

Charts

Weekly charts

Year-end charts

Certifications

References

See also
AOL Music

2001 albums
Gary Allan albums
Albums produced by Tony Brown (record producer)
Albums produced by Mark Wright (record producer)
MCA Records albums